The Indian women's cricket team toured England in month June–July of Season 1986. The tour included a series of 3 Women's Test matches and a series of 3 Women's One Day Internationals. Team India also played 16 tour matches against domestic teams. England women won the ODI series 3-0 and the Test series ended in an draw 0-0.

Squads

WODI series

First WODI

Second WODI

Third WODI

Women's Test series

First Women's Test

Second Women's Test

Third Women's Test

References

External links 
 Tour home at ESPN Cricinfo
 

India 1986
England 1986
1986 in women's cricket
1986 in English cricket
1986 in Indian cricket